19-year-old Kenneka Jenkins was found dead inside a latched freezer of the Crowne Plaza Chicago O'Hare hotel in Rosemont, Illinois, after attending a party there on September 8, 2017. 

The medical examiner's report found Jenkins' death to be accidental. Alcohol and topiramate found in her system were thought to have hastened the effects of hypothermia sustained by Jenkins remaining inside the freezer. While the Rosemont police department did not suspect foul play, they stated that their investigation was incomplete. Jenkins' family and friends criticized the initial police response, and a lawsuit was subsequently filed against the hotel and others.

Death 
Kenneka Jenkins was with friends at a party that took place in Room 926 of the Crowne Plaza Chicago O'Hare hotel in Rosemont, a suburb of Chicago. The party started at 11:30 p.m. on Friday, September 8, 2017. An acquaintance who arrived at the party noticed that Jenkins appeared to be swaying back and forth as she embraced him in a hug. Several witnesses reported seeing her drink cognac, but did not see her partake of any marijuana or other drugs. Another witness reported that Jenkins "wasn't acting like her usual self", noting that she would dance a little, but later appeared to be sad and went to go sit down. She was briefly seen with others walking through one of the halls in the hotel. Camera footage later surfaced of Jenkins staggering near the front desk at 3:20 a.m.

About one hour later, Jenkins' friends contacted her mother, Teresa Martin, who arrived at the hotel around 5:30 a.m. to assist in the search. She proceeded to knock on many guests' doors from the top floor to the bottom, until a hotel employee called 911 to complain. Hotel management stated that they could not provide access to video footage from the night before until someone reported Jenkins missing to the police, who officially reported her missing to hotel management at 1:15 p.m. Saturday. Family members later characterized the initial police response as lacking in urgency. A first check of camera footage that focused on entrances and exits turned up nothing, but at 10 p.m., police spotted footage of Jenkins stumbling through the hotel. Her whereabouts remained unknown until she was found in the hotel's freezer and pronounced dead at 12:48 a.m. Sunday. She was found lying face down on her side, with one shoe off. There was no sign of trauma other than a small cut on her foot. The temperature inside the freezer was found to be  approximately two hours after the doors had been left open.

Investigation 
The freezer, which was on and working, was described as a walk-in freezer within a walk-in cooler, and was part of an unused kitchen. Lights were apparently turned off in both chambers when she entered them. Questions remained as to why the freezer was turned on, although it was reportedly being leased out to a restaurant using space in the hotel. Motion-detecting security cameras showed Jenkins staggering, apparently intoxicated, through the hotel's hallways, eventually arriving at the kitchen, where she rounded a corner towards the freezer. The freezer door itself was out of the camera's sight.

On October 6, 2017, the Cook County Medical Examiner's Office ruled Jenkins' death an accident. The autopsy report found no illegal drugs in Jenkins' system, but her blood alcohol level was found to be 0.112. Traces of topiramate, a drug used to treat epilepsy and migraine headaches, were found in her system, although she was never prescribed this medication. Topiramate taken together with alcohol can enhance the effects of both, and hasten the onset of hypothermia, the presence of which was confirmed by lesions found in Jenkins' stomach. Brain swelling was also observed, but this condition was not associated with the cause of death. The Rosemont police department issued a statement the same day, saying that while no foul play was suspected, their investigation had not yet been completed.

Jenkins' friends' stories remained inconsistent as to exactly what had happened after the party. After she went missing, one friend texted another about how Jenkins was drunk and missing. The reply came back, "Find Kenneka," and "I can't believe ya'll  lost her." They told Martin that Jenkins had gone downstairs with some people, but they left her alone to go and retrieve a cellphone from one of the hotel rooms.

Litigation 
In 2018, the family's attorney, Geoffrey Fieger, filed a $50 million lawsuit against the hotel and others. He displayed photos of a freezer door, showing that it had a lock button from the outside, and suggested someone may have inadvertently locked the freezer door. This was contradicted by the security camera, which recorded no other footage since August 30, nor any after Jenkins' footage. The photo seemed not to be of the actual freezer door, which latched shut but apparently had no lock. A white circular handle on the inside, which would have enabled a person to exit on their own, appeared to be in good working order. The attorney asserted that the hotel had the means to lock off the kitchen area, as it had a pair of plywood doors with a padlock.

See also
Deaths in September 2017
Death of Elisa Lam, Canadian college student found dead in water tank atop downtown Los Angeles hotel in 2013; also last seen alive on hotel surveillance cameras acting strangely.

References

External links 
 Kenneka Jenkins at Find a Grave

2017 in Illinois
September 2017 events in the United States
Deaths by person in Illinois
Deaths from hypothermia
Rosemont, Illinois
Women deaths